Rae Spoon is a Canadian musician and writer. Their musical style has varied from country to electronic-influenced indie rock and folk punk.

Personal life

Spoon grew up as a transgender person in Calgary, Alberta. They were raised in a Pentecostal household to a paranoid-schizophrenic father. Their father's religious beliefs caused anxiety to a teenage Rae. Spoon now lives in Victoria, British Columbia.

In 2003, Spoon said they identified as a trans man. In 2012, during an interview with fellow advocate for the gender-neutral pronoun and cartoonist, Elisha Lim, Spoon noted a preference for the pronoun "they", and has identified as non-binary since then. They explained to Now Magazine, "after years of fighting to be called 'he,' the idea of coming out again made me tired. But now I feel kind of rejuvenated, ready to fight on some more. I think the 'they' pronoun is a pretty cool thing. It's letting a lot of people not have to identify as a man or a woman. Whatever it means to them."

During the 2020 COVID-19 pandemic, which forced them to cancel a series of tours, Spoon was diagnosed with cervical cancer. They said they didn't know what the prognosis was at that point.

Career

Spoon started performing before they started recording. They decided they wanted to become a songwriter while performing at the age of seventeen. They emerged as a country and roots singer. Their early music features country imagery to the sound of acoustic string instruments such as banjo, guitar and mandolin.

Spoon has performed with such artists as Annabelle Chvostek, Ember Swift, Kinnie Starr, Melissa Ferrick, The Be Good Tanyas, Bitch & Animal, Natalie Merchant and Earl Scruggs. They have performed at festivals including North Country Fair, South Country Fair, Under the Volcano Festival, and the Vancouver, Regina, Ottawa, Calgary, Edmonton, Brandon Folk, Music & Art Festival and Winnipeg folk festivals.

Spoon's breakthrough album, 2008's Superioryouareinferior, was recorded in Calgary and introduced some electronic music elements into Spoon's style. Superioryouareinferior includes themes previously used by Spoon like Canadian history and culture such as the commentary on colonialism in their song "Come On Forest Fire Burn The Disco Down". Superioryouareinferior was a longlisted nominee for the 2009 Polaris Music Prize.

While touring Europe Spoon met Alexandre Decoupigny in Berlin. Decoupigny and Spoon collaborated in the album Worauf Wartest Du? Decoupigny taught Spoon how to create music with a computer which inspired the musician to further experiment with electronic music. The experimentation with electronic music influenced their subsequent albums and culminated in I Can't Keep All Our Secrets.

They have also published First Spring Grass Fire, a book of short stories about growing up in Alberta. Arsenal Pulp Press released the book in the fall of 2012. The book was a nominee for the 2013 Lambda Literary Awards in the Transgender Fiction category, and Spoon was awarded an Honour of Distinction from the Dayne Ogilvie Prize for LGBT writers in 2014.

Spoon has stated that First Spring Grass Fire was written to help them prepare for the production of a National Film Board of Canada documentary about their life and music, My Prairie Home, directed by Chelsea McMullan. The film was released in the fall of 2013. My Prairie Home, the album of music that Spoon composed for the film, was a longlisted nominee for the 2014 Polaris Music Prize.

In 2012, Spoon and Ivan Coyote collaborated on Gender Failure, a touring multimedia show in which both artists performed music and spoken word pieces about their failed attempts at fitting into the gender binary. A book based on the show was published by Arsenal Pulp in 2014. Gender Failure was nominated for the ALA's Over the Rainbow Project List in 2015.

In 2014, Spoon composed music for the feature film The Valley Below.

Spoon began the music label Coax Records "out of a love for indie music and as an answer to under representation for many groups in the music industry." The album "Armour" was released on Coax in 2016.

In 2017, Spoon published a manual in the How To series, entitled How to (Hide) Be(hind) Your Songs.

Discography
 Honking at Minivans (2001)
 Throw Some Dirt on Me (2003)
 Your Trailer Door (2005)
 White Hearse Comes Rolling (2006)
 Trucker's Memorial (2006, with Rodney Decroo)
 superioryouareinferior (2008)
 Worauf wartest du? (2009, with Alexandre Decoupigny)
 Love Is a Hunter (2010)
 I Can't Keep All of Our Secrets (2012)
 My Prairie Home (2013)
 Armour (2016)
 Jump With Your Eyes Closed (2016)
 They with Plastik (2016)
 My Side of the Mountain with Clyde Petersen (2016)
 bodiesofwater (2018)
 Rae Spoon With Jesus and His Judgemental Father (2019)
 Mental Health (2019)

References

External links
 
 Rae Spoon at CBC Radio 3
 

Year of birth missing (living people)
Canadian country singer-songwriters
Canadian folk guitarists
Canadian folk singer-songwriters
Living people
Non-binary musicians
Canadian indie rock musicians
Musicians from Calgary
Writers from Calgary
Folk punk musicians
21st-century Canadian short story writers
Musicians from Montreal
Writers from Montreal
Anglophone Quebec people
Canadian film score composers
Canadian LGBT singers
21st-century Canadian singers
Canadian non-binary writers
21st-century Canadian LGBT people